The Nokia Asha 311 is a "Full Touch" smartphone powered by Nokia's Series 40 operating system. It was announced at Bangkok by Nokia along with two others Asha Full Touch phones - the Nokia Asha 305 and 306. The 311 is considered to be the flagship of the Asha Full Touch family. Its main features are the Full Touch capacitive touchscreen, the pentaband 3G radio, SIP VoIP over 3G and Wi-Fi and the ability to play games. Nokia Asha 311 is available in a number of languages depending on which territory it is marketed for.

History and availability 
The Nokia Asha 311 was announced at Bangkok by Nokia.  It was made available 3Q in 2012 globally.  The phone was sold at a price of €92 subject to taxes and subsidies.

Hardware

Processors 
The Nokia Asha 311 is powered by a 1 GHz processor and includes 128 MB of low power single channel RAM (Mobile DDR).

Screen and input 
The Nokia Asha 311 has a 3.0-inch capacitive touchscreen (multi point) with a resolution of 240 x 400 pixel (QVGA). According to Nokia it is capable of displaying up to 262 thousand colors.

The back camera has an extended depth of field feature (no mechanical zoom), no flash and has a 4× digital zoom for both video and camera.  The sensor size of the back camera is 3.2-megapixel (2048 x 1536 px), has a f/2.8 aperture and a 50 cm to infinity focus range.  It is capable of video recording at up to 640 x 480 px at 15 fps with mono sound.

Buttons 
Two physical "call" and "end" keys are positioned on the face of the device. The right side of the device hosts the volume rocker and lock/unlock button.

Battery and SIM 
The battery life of the BL-4U (1100 mAh) as claimed by Nokia is 7.2 hours of talk time, from 711 to 781 hours of standby and 40 hours of music playback depending on actual usage.

The SIM card is located under the battery which can be accessed by removing the back panel of the device. No tool is necessary to remove the back panel.

Storage 
The phone has 140 MB of available non-removable storage.  Additional storage is available via a microSDHC card socket, which is certified to support up to 32 GB of additional storage..

Software 
The Nokia Asha 311 is powered by Nokia Series 40 Full Touch operating system and comes with a variety of applications:

 Web: Opera mini browser(since 2015).Before the Nokia - Opera agreement in 2015,S40(series 40) mobiles had Nokia (proxy) Browser.
 Conversations: Nokia Messaging Service 3.2 (instant messaging and e-mail) and SMS,  MMS
 Media: Camera, Photos, Music player, Nokia Music Store (on selected market), Flash Lite 3.0 (for YouTube video), Video player 
 Personal Information Management: Calendar, Detailed contact information
 Utilities: VoIP, Notes, Calculator, To-do list, Alarm clock, Voice recorder, Timer

The device comes with Nokia Maps for Series 40 and make use of cellular network for positioning as there is no GPS in the phone.  Nokia Maps for Series 40 phones does not provide voice-guided navigation and only allows for basic route (< 10 km) to be planned.  The software will provide step-by-step instructions, allows the user to see the route on a map, and search for nearby points of interest.  Depending on where the phone was purchased, regional maps (Europe, South America, etc.) are preloaded, and as such, an active Internet connection to download map data is not required.

 Games: 
BALTORO GAMES: Unicorn Run

GAMELOFT: Diamond Twister 2, Green Farm, Littlest Pet Shop, Real Football 2012

Golden Hoang: Minion Pro 2014

HUDSON SOFT: Lode Runner

India games: Serenity

LucasArts: Angry Birds Star Wars

Mank: Domino 1.1

Manotech: Ball Balance Season

MineCraftServerGamer App:This App has been discontinued

MobiLeap: MobiChess

Namco Badnai: Ridge Racer Drift

Nokia: dice, maze, memorize, Picture Puzzle

Offscreen Technologies Ltd.: Tic-Tac-Toe

Pixiem: Inline Skate Etty

Softgames: Pet Shop

Tequila.Mobile: Fantasy Kingdom Defense

twistbox: Giana Sisters II

?:Fighters, Gedda Headz, Simcity Deluxe, Temple Run 2

See also
 List of Nokia products
 Comparison of smartphones

References

External links
 Press Release
 Device specifications

Nokia smartphones